IRMA may refer to:
Illinois Rape Myth Acceptance Scale
Institute of Rural Management, Anand, a management school for rural development in the state of Gujarat, India
International Rail Makers Association, a cartel of the late 19th and early 20th century
International Recording Media Association
International Rectal Microbicide Advocates
Intraretinal microvascular abnormalities, a component of diabetic eye disease
Irish Recorded Music Association
IRMA board, a brand name of mainframe terminal emulators
Immunoradiometric assay, a type of biochemical test
Intreprinderea de Reparatii Material Aeronautic, a Romanian aircraft manufacturer

See also
Irma (disambiguation)

fr:IRMA